is Ringo Sheena's 15th single and her 2nd double A-side single. It was released on 31 July 2015 by Universal Music Japan.

Background and development 
"Nagaku Mijikai Matsuri" was used in advertisements for Coca-Cola Japan's 2015 summer campaign. "Kamisama, Hotokesama" was used as an TV commercial jingle for the au smartphone "isai vivid" manufactured by LG Electronics, in which Sheena also stars in the commercial.

A picture of the Nebuta Matsuri was used for the album artwork of the single.

Sheena sings two duets in both songs with two of her close male musician friends: Ryosuke Nagaoka, also known as Ukigumo (former member of Tokyo Jihen) in "Nagaku Mijikai Matsuri" and Shutoku Mukai for "Kamisama, Hotokesama".

Music video 
Both videos for "Nagaku Mijikai Matsuri" and "Kamisama, Hotokesama" are directed by Yuichi Kodama. The video of "Nagaku Mijikai Matsuri" is inspired by the song theme "the summer of woman’s life". The first video shows an impatient heroine interspersed with scenes of Sheena and Ukigumo singing a duet together. The session musicians who played the song at the recording session there also appear on the "Kamisama, Hotokesama" video, where they play as spectres of the "Hyakki Yagyō".

Both music videos were released in full on 31 July 2015 at Ringo Sheena's YouTube channel.

Track listing

Credits and personnel 
Credits are taken from the singles's liner notes.

Nagaku Mijikai Matsuri
 Ringo Sheena – vocals, songwriter, arrangement, digital programming
 Ryosuke Nagaoka – vocals
 Tom Tamada – drums
 Keisuke Torigoe – bass
 Masayuki Hiizumi – wurlitzer & piano
 Koji Nishimura – trumpet
 Masahiko Sugasaka – trumpet
 Yoichi Murata – trombone, wind instrument arrangement
 Mataro Misawa – percussion
 Uni Inoue – recording & mixing 

Kamisama, Hotokesama
 Ringo Sheena – vocals, songwriter, arrangement
 Tom Tamada – drums
 Keisuke Torigoe – bass 
 Masayuki Hiizumi – clavinet 
 Ryosuke Nagaoka – guitar, sitar & background vocals
 Koji Nishimura – trumpet
 Masahiko Sugasaka – trumpet
 Yoichi Murata – trombone, wind instrument arrangement
 Takuo Yamamoto – tenor sax & flute
 U-zhaan – tabla
 Shutoku Mukai – vocals, lyrics
 Uni Inoue – recording & mixing

Notes

References

External links
 Ringo Sheena "Nagaku Mijikai Matsuri/Kamisama, Hotokesama" special web site
  (SheenaRingoVEVO)
  (SheenaRingoVEVO)
  (Ringo Sheena official channel)

2015 singles
2015 songs
EMI Music Japan singles
Japanese-language songs
Ringo Sheena songs
Songs used as jingles
Songs written by Ringo Sheena
Music videos directed by Yuichi Kodama